Paul Greengrass  (born 13 August 1955) is a British film director, film producer, screenwriter and former journalist. He specialises in dramatisations of historic events and is known for his signature use of hand-held cameras.

His early film Bloody Sunday (2002), about the 1972 shootings in Derry, Northern Ireland, won the Golden Bear at 52nd Berlin International Film Festival. Other films he has directed include three in the Bourne action/thriller series: The Bourne Supremacy (2004), The Bourne Ultimatum (2007), and Jason Bourne (2016); United 93 (2006), for which he won the BAFTA Award for Best Director and received an Academy Award for Best Director nomination; Green Zone (2010); and Captain Phillips (2013). In 2004, he co-wrote and produced the film Omagh, which won the British Academy Television Award.

In 2007, Greengrass co-founded Directors UK, a professional organisation of British filmmakers, and was its first president until 2014. In 2008, The Telegraph named him among the most influential people in British culture. In 2017, Greengrass was honoured with a British Film Institute Fellowship.

Early life
Greengrass was born 13 August 1955 in Cheam, Surrey, England. His mother was a teacher and his father a river pilot and merchant seaman. His brother Mark Greengrass is a noted English historian.

Greengrass was educated at Westcourt Primary School, Gravesend Grammar School and Sevenoaks School; he attended Queens' College, Cambridge. He studied English literature at the same time as Roger Michell.

Career

Journalism
Greengrass first worked as a director in the 1980s, for the ITV current affairs programme World in Action. At the same time he co-authored the book Spycatcher (1987) with Peter Wright, former assistant director of MI5. It contained enough sensitive information that the British Government made an unsuccessful attempt to ban it.

Film

Greengrass moved into drama, directing non-fiction, made-for-television films such as The One That Got Away, based on Chris Ryan's book about SAS actions in the Gulf War and The Fix, based on the 1964 betting scandal that shook British football.

His 1998 film The Theory of Flight starred Kenneth Branagh and Helena Bonham Carter, who played a woman with motor neurone disease. The film dealt with the difficult issue of the sexuality of people with disabilities.

Greengrass directed The Murder of Stephen Lawrence (1999), an account of Stephen Lawrence, a black youth whose murder was not properly investigated by the Metropolitan Police. His mother's investigations resulted in accusations about institutional racism in the police.

Bloody Sunday (2002), depicted the 1972 Bloody Sunday shootings of Irish anti-internment activists by British soldiers in an almost documentary style; it shared First Prize at the 2002 Berlin Film Festival with Hayao Miyazaki's Spirited Away. Bloody Sunday was inspired by Don Mullan's politically influential book Eyewitness Bloody Sunday (Wolfhound Press, 1997). A schoolboy witness of the events of Bloody Sunday, Mullan was co-producer and appeared as a figure in Bloody Sunday.

In 2004, Greengrass co-wrote the television film Omagh with Guy Hibbert. Based on the bombing of 1998, the film was a critical success, winning British Academy Television Award for Best Single Drama. This was the first professional film that Greengrass had not directed; he was credited as a writer and producer. He had been working on The Bourne Supremacy. The film was directed by Pete Travis. It was the second film Greengrass had written about terrorism and mass killing in Ireland after Bloody Sunday.

Based on that film, Greengrass was hired to direct 2004's The Bourne Supremacy, a sequel to the 2002 film The Bourne Identity. The first film's director, Doug Liman, had left the project. The film starred Matt Damon as Jason Bourne, an amnesiac who realises he was once a top CIA assassin and is being pursued by his former employers. An unexpectedly major financial and critical success, it secured Greengrass's reputation and ability to get his smaller, more personal films made.

In 2006, Greengrass directed United 93, a film based on the 11 September 2001 hijacking of United Airlines Flight 93. The film received critical acclaim, particularly for Greengrass's quasi-documentary-style. After receiving many Best Director awards and nominations from critics' circles (including the Broadcast Film Critics Association), Greengrass won the BAFTA award for Best Director at the 60th British Academy Film Awards and received an Oscar nomination for Achievement in Directing at the 79th Academy Awards. For his role in writing the film, he earned the Writers Guild of America Award and a BAFTA nominations for Best Original Screenplay.

He returned to the money-making Bourne franchise. The Bourne Ultimatum, released in 2007, was an even bigger success than the previous two films. Greengrass was nominated for BAFTA Best Director at the 61st British Academy Film Awards.

In 2007, he co-founded Directors UK, a professional association for British directors. He served as founding president until July 2014.

Greengrass's Green Zone stars Matt Damon as the head of a U.S. military team on an unsuccessful hunt for weapons of mass destruction in post-war Iraq. It was filmed in Spain and Morocco and released in 2010. The film was first announced as based on the bestselling, award-winning, non-fiction book Imperial Life in the Emerald City, by Rajiv Chandrasekaran, the Washington Posts Baghdad bureau chief. But the final film is a largely fictionalised action thriller only loosely inspired by events in the book.

Captain Phillips, Greengrass's film about the Maersk Alabama hijacking in 2009, was based on the book A Captain's Duty. It starred Tom Hanks, Barkhad Abdi, and Faysal Ahmed. It was shot in 2012 in Massachusetts and Virginia in the United States, and Malta. It was released in 2013.

In September 2014, it was announced Greengrass would return to direct the fifth Jason Bourne film, Jason Bourne, with Damon starring again. The film was released on 29 July 2016.

In 2017, Greengrass began filming 22 July, a docudrama film following the 2011 Norway attacks perpetrated by Anders Behring Breivik and their aftermath, on location in Norway. The film was released on Netflix and in select theaters on 10 October 2018.

In February 2019, Greengrass signed on to direct the film adaptation of the Paulette Jiles novel News of the World for Fox 2000 Pictures, reuniting him with actor Tom Hanks. The film was eventually released in the United States by Universal Pictures on 25 December 2020 and released internationally by Netflix in 2021.

In May 2022, it was announced that Greengrass would write and direct medieval action film The Hood, starring Benedict Cumberbatch and based on the story of the English Peasants' Revolt in 1381. On September 15, it was announced Greengrass would write and direct an adaptation of the Stephen King novel Fairy Tale after King, a fan of Greengrass's films, sold him the option to adapt the film; Greengrass will also produce alongside Gregory Goodman.

He was appointed Commander of the Order of the British Empire (CBE) in the 2022 New Year Honours for services to the arts.

Personal life
Greengrass has said that he professes irreligion but has "great respect for the spiritual way". Greengrass is married to talent agent Joanna Kaye, with whom he has three children, and is the father of two more children from an earlier marriage.

He is a supporter of Crystal Palace F.C.

Filmography

Films

Television 

TV movies

Documentary series

Awards and nominations

References

External links

 
BAFTA Interview with Paul Greengras, Latitude Festival, 2010

1955 births
Alumni of Queens' College, Cambridge
Best Director BAFTA Award winners
Commanders of the Order of the British Empire
Directors of Golden Bear winners
English republicans
English film directors
English non-fiction writers
English screenwriters
English male screenwriters
Living people
People educated at Sevenoaks School
People from Cheam
People educated at Gravesend Grammar School
English-language film directors
English male non-fiction writers
Action film directors